Segwarusa (YT-365) was laid down on 6 March 1944 by Consolidated Shipbuilding Corp., Morris Heights, N.Y.; launched on 22 April; delivered to the Navy and placed in service on 25 September 1944.

Segwarusa was allocated to the 5th Naval District and based at Norfolk, Virginia. She was reclassified as YTB-365 on 15 May 1944 and as YTM-365 on 24 November 1961. She provided fire-fighting, tug, and salvage services to ships and installations in the Norfolk area throughout her long career. Segwarusa was struck from the Navy list on 1 January 1974, sold for scrap to Marine Power & Equip. Co., Seattle, Washington, and removed from Navy custody on 25 June 1974.

References
 
 
 NavSource Online: Service Ship Photo Archive Segwarusa (YTM-365)

 

Sassaba-class tugs
Ships built in Morris Heights, Bronx
1944 ships
World War II auxiliary ships of the United States